Jalcophila is a genus of flowering plants in the family Asteraceae.

 Species
 Jalcophila boliviensis Anderb. & S.E.Freire - Bolivia
 Jalcophila colombiana S.Díaz & Vélez-Nauer - Nariño region in Colombia
 Jalcophila ecuadorensis M.O.Dillon & Sagást. - Nariño region in Colombia, Carchi + Napo Provinces in Ecuador
 Jalcophila peruviana M.O.Dillon & Sagást. - La Libertad Region in Perú

References

 
Asteraceae genera
Taxonomy articles created by Polbot